Retlaw may refer to:

Companies
 Retlaw Enterprises, privately held company owned by the Disney family

People
 C. J. Hamilton (author) (1841–1935), author who wrote under the pen name Retlaw Spring
 Retlaw Yensid, an alias of Walt Disney
 William Retlaw Williams (1863–1944), Welsh writer

Places
 Retlaw, Alberta